Shābāsh (Kannada: ಶಭಾಷ್, Telugu: శబాష్, Urdu: شاباش, Punjabi: ਸ਼ਾਬਾਸ਼, Bengali: শাবাশ, Hindi: शाबाश) is a term used in the Indian subcontinent to signal commendation for an achievement, similar in meaning to bravo and kudos. It may also refer to:

 Shabash Bangladesh, a sculpture commemorating the fighters of the Bangladesh Liberation War
 Shabaash India, a reality show on Zee TV
 Shabash Daddy, a 1979 Bollywood film directed by Kishore Kumar 
 Shabash Anarkali, a Hindustani play parodying of the historical Saleem-Anarkali romance
 Shabash Sharon, a 1986 pop music album produced by Anand–Milind
 "Shabash Pulish", a solo track on Nandigram, a 2007 Bengali album produced by Kabir Suman
 Shabash Khan, a town in Wardak Province, Afghanistan
 Shabash (album), a 1991 album by the Russian band Alisa